Requiem is the fourth album by the Italian alternative-rock band Verdena, released in 2007. It was published not only in Italy but also abroad: the same day in Switzerland, Germany and Austria on April 13 and April 16 in France.

Track list
Marti in the sky – 0:23
Don Calisto – 3:02
Non prendere l'acme, Eugenio – 6:05
Angie – 3:44
Aha – 1:06
Isacco nucleare – 4:18
Caños – 3:43
Il Gulliver – 11:54
Faro – 0:47
Muori Delay – 2:42
Trovami un modo semplice per uscirne – 3:34
Opanopono – 1:50
Il caos strisciante – 4:35
Was? – 2:06
Sotto prescrizione del dott. Huxley – 12:35
Non è (only in the vinyl press)

References

2007 albums
Universal Music Italy albums
Verdena albums